Daniel Godfrey (4 September 1831 – 30 June 1903) was a bandmaster, composer and arranger of compositions for military bands. He was for many years bandmaster of the Grenadier Guards.

Life
He was born in Westminster in 1831, eldest of four sons of Charles Godfrey, bandmaster of the Coldstream Guards for fifty years. His eldest brother, George William Godfrey, was well known as a playwright. Daniel Godfrey was educated at the Royal Academy of Music, where he subsequently became professor of military music and was elected a fellow. In his early days he was a flute player in the orchestra of Louis-Antoine Jullien and at the Royal Italian Opera.

In 1856, on the recommendation of Sir Michael Costa, he was, through the influence of the Prince Consort Albert, appointed bandmaster of the Grenadier Guards. One of his first duties was to play into London the brigade of guards returning from the Crimean War. In 1863 he composed his "Guards" waltz for the ball given by the officers of the guards to the Prince and Princess of Wales, later King Edward VII and Queen Alexandra, on their marriage. This became popular, as did his "Mabel" and "Hilda" waltzes. He was also successful as an arranger of compositions for military bands.

Godfrey made a tour with his band in the United States in 1876, in celebration of the centenary of American Independence. It was the first visit of an English military band since the creation of the republic, and a special Act of Parliament had to be passed to authorise it.

At the Golden Jubilee of Queen Victoria in 1887, he was promoted second-lieutenant – the first bandmaster who received a commission in the army – and he was decorated with the Jubilee Medal. In 1891 he reached the age limit of sixty, but his period of service was extended for five years. He retired from the army on 4 September 1896, with the reputation of England's leading bandmaster.

Subsequently he formed a private military band which played at the chief exhibitions in England, and with which he twice toured America and Canada. He died in Beeston, Nottinghamshire, on 30 June 1903.

Godfrey married in 1856 Joyce Boyles, and they had two sons and three daughters. His eldest son, Dan Godfrey (1868–1939), became a successful conductor.

References

Attribution

External links
 
 

1831 births
1903 deaths
19th-century British composers
British military musicians
Fellows of the Royal Academy of Music
Academics of the Royal Academy of Music
Grenadier Guards soldiers
Grenadier Guards officers